Streptomyces boncukensis is a Gram-positive, aerobic and non-motile bacterium species from the genus Streptomyces which has been isolated from soil from the Boncuk Saltern in Sungurlu-Çorum.

See also 
 List of Streptomyces species

References 

boncukensis
Bacteria described in 2021